The Joseph R. Biden, Jr. School of Public Policy & Administration is an independent entity at the University of Delaware in Newark, Delaware, and is named for the 46th and current president of the United States, Joe Biden. Formerly the School of Public Policy Administration, the school offers three bachelors, six masters and an online MPA and four doctoral degree programs in "research and public service activities to improve the quality of life in communities around the world."

According to U.S. News & World Report, the Joseph R. Biden, Jr. School of Public Policy and Administration is ranked 38th among 269 national public affairs schools. It is also ranked 36th in the field of public management and leadership; and ranked 16th in the areas of public finance and budgeting.

The Master in Public Administration program is accredited by the National Association of School of Public Affairs and Administration (NASPAA) and is also the only MPA program in the state of Delaware to be NASPAA-accredited.

History
On December 11, 2018, at University of Delaware's Board of Trustees, the school's president, Dennis Assanis announced the establishment of the Joseph R. Biden, Jr. School of Public Policy and Administration. Biden is an alumnus of the university, having graduated with a bachelor's degree in 1965. The School is the second program on campus named for Biden. In 2017, he founded the university's Biden Institute, a research and policy center whose mission is to make an impact in the fields of women's and civil rights, criminal justice reform, environmental sustainability and economic reform. The Biden Institute will remain a part of the new Biden School.

The Biden School is one of seven schools of public affairs named for U.S. presidents.

Research and public service centers
The Biden School has six research and public service centers.
 The Biden Institute: In 2017, the former vice president of the United States, Joe Biden, launched the Biden Institute at the University of Delaware. Biden had said the university was particularly close to his heart and he had been thinking about what he wanted to do after he left office. He wanted to continue his work on female empowerment, civil liberties, economic opportunity for the middle class and other social issues, so his alma mater was a natural fit. The Biden Institute, like the University of Pennsylvania’s Penn Biden Center for Diplomacy and Global Engagement, will continue to remain active during Biden's presidency.
Center for Applied Demography and Survey Research (CADSR)
Center for Community Research and Service (CCRS)
Center for Energy and Environmental Policy (CEEP)
Center for Historic Architecture and Design (CHAD)
Disaster Research Center (DRC)
Institute for Public Administration (IPA)

References

External links

University of Delaware
Public administration schools in the United States
Public policy schools
Schools of international relations in the United States
2018 establishments in the United States